The 1992 NCAA Men's Division I Basketball Championship Game was the finals of the 1992 NCAA Men's Division I Basketball Tournament and it determined the national champion for the 1991-92 NCAA Division I men's basketball season  The 1992 National Title Game was played on April 6, 1992 at the Hubert H. Humphrey Metrodome in Minneapolis, Minnesota. The 1992 National Title Game was played between the 1992 East Regional Champions, #1-seeded Duke and the 1992 Southeast Regional Champions, #6-seeded Michigan.

Participating teams

Michigan Wolverines

Southeast
Michigan (6) 73, Temple (11) 66
Michigan 102, East Tennessee State (14) 90
Michigan 75, Oklahoma State (2) 72
Michigan 75, Ohio State (1) 71
Final Four
Michigan 76, Cincinnati (4) 72

Duke Blue Devils

East
Duke (1) 82, Campbell (16) 56
Duke 75, Iowa (9) 62
Duke 81, Seton Hall (4) 69
Duke 104, Kentucky (2) 103
Final Four
Duke 81, Indiana (2) 78

Starting lineups

Game summary
Source:

References

NCAA Division I Men's Basketball Championship Game
NCAA Division I Men's Basketball Championship Games
Duke Blue Devils men's basketball
Michigan Wolverines men's basketball
College sports tournaments in Minnesota
Basketball competitions in Minneapolis
NCAA Division I Men's Basketball Championship Game
NCAA Division I Basketball Championship Game, 1992
NCAA Division I Basketball Championship Game